Turkmenistan first competed at the Asian Games in 1994.

Medals by games

Asian Games

Asian Indoor Games

Asian Beach Games

Asian Martial Arts Games

Asian Youth Games

Medals by sport

Asian Games

Asian Martial Arts Games

References